Events during the year 1976 in Northern Ireland.

Incumbents
Secretary of State - Merlyn Rees (until 10 September), Roy Mason (from 10 September)

Events
5 January - Kingsmill massacre: ten Protestant men killed in South Armagh, Northern Ireland, by members of the Provisional Irish Republican Army (IRA), using the cover name "South Armagh Republican Action Force".
1 March - Merlyn Rees ends Special Category Status for those sentenced for crimes relating to the civil violence in Northern Ireland.
4 March - The Northern Ireland Constitutional Convention is formally dissolved in Northern Ireland resulting in direct rule of Northern Ireland from London via the British parliament.
12 March - Lenny Murphy, leader of the Shankill Butchers, is arrested, but his gang continue to murder.
17 March - Hillcrest Bar bombing: 4 catholics are killed and a further 50 injured in Hillcrest, Dungannon,  Tyrone, Northern Ireland when a car bomb by the Ulster Volunteer Force (UVF) goes off outside a crowded pub on Saint Patrick's Day.  The attack is one of the many attributed to the Glenanne gang.
15 July - Four prisoners escape when bombs explode in the Special Criminal Court, Dublin.
21 July - Christopher Ewart-Biggs, UK ambassador, and a civil servant, Judith Cooke, are killed by a landmine at Sandyford, Co. Dublin.
10 August - Three children die when are hit by a car whose driver, an IRA fugitive named Danny Lennon, is fatally shot by British troops. A witness, Betty Williams, is inspired to set up Women for Peace.
14 August - 10,000 Protestant and Catholic women demonstrate for peace in Northern Ireland.
14 September - Kieran Nugent is first IRA man to be admitted to the Maze Prison without Special Category Status. He becomes the first blanketman.
November - The Provisional Irish Republican Army restructures on cellular lines.
10 December - Betty Williams and Mairead Corrigan win the Nobel Peace Prize.
Ruth Patterson becomes the first woman to be ordained to the ministry of the Presbyterian Church in Ireland.

Arts and literature
16 March - Downtown Radio, an adult contemporary music station, begins broadcasting from Newtownards to the Belfast area, the first Independent Local Radio in Northern Ireland.
Ciaran Carson publishes his first book, the poetry collection The New Estate.

Sport

Football
Irish League
Winners: Crusaders

Irish Cup
Winners: Carrick Rangers 2 - 1 Linfield

Births
25 March - Francis Bellew, Gaelic footballer.
30 March - Mark McClelland, musician, formerly with Snow Patrol.
3 June - Paul Berry, former Democratic Unionist Party MLA.
12 June - Ian McCrea, Democratic Unionist Party MLA.
15 June - Gary Lightbody, musician with Snow Patrol.
18 August - Damaen Kelly, boxer.
25 October - Steve Jones, footballer.
29 October - Stephen Craigan, footballer.

Deaths
4 May - Hugh Delargy, British Labour Party politician and MP (born 1908).
29 July - Knox Cunningham, barrister, businessman and Ulster Unionist politician (born 1909).
7 October - Michael O'Neill, nationalist politician and MP (born 1909).
4 December - W. F. McCoy, Ulster Unionist member of the Parliament of Northern Ireland (born 1886).

See also
1976 in Scotland
1976 in Wales

References

 
Northern Ireland